Sir John Edwards, 1st Baronet (15 January 1770 – 15 April 1850), was a Whig politician who served as Member of Parliament for Montgomery from 8 April 1833 to 23 June 1841. The Edwards Baronetcy, of Garth in the County of Montgomery, was created for him in the Baronetage of the United Kingdom on 23 July 1838. Since he had no male heirs, the estate passed to his daughter Mary Cornelia Edwards (c.1829-1906) and the title became extinct on his death.

On 3 August 1846 Mary Cornelia Edwards married George Vane-Tempest, Viscount Seaham, later to become Earl Vane and the 5th Marquess of Londonderry. After her father's death, they used Plas Machynlleth as their family seat.

Sir John Edwards' father was John Edwards (d.1789), a solicitor of Plas Machynlleth (also known as 'Greenfields'), Montgomeryshire. The senior Edwards acquired the Garth estate by his marriage to his third wife, Cornelia Owen, only child and heiress of Richard Owen and his wife. The estate included the profitable Van lead mines. Sir John Edwards added to the mansion, and expanded the estate by purchase of parts of the Peniarth Estate along the Dyfi Valley.

References

The National Archives, PCC wills, PROB11/2114, Will of Sir John Edwards, proved 1850.
National Library of Wales, Plas Machynlleth estate records, context and administrative history.
ThePeerage.com

Baronets in the Baronetage of the United Kingdom
1770 births
1850 deaths
Whig (British political party) MPs for Welsh constituencies
UK MPs 1832–1835
UK MPs 1835–1837
UK MPs 1837–1841